Flaviporus is a genus of poroid fungi in the family Steccherinaceae.

Taxonomy

Flaviporus was circumscribed by American mycologist William Alphonso Murrill in 1905. He designated the type species as Flaviporus rufoflavus; this taxon is now considered the same as Flaviporus brownii.  The generic name combines the Latin word flavus ("light yellow") with the Ancient Greek  (pore).

Description
Murrill described the characteristics of Flaviporus as follows: "Hymenium annual, often reviving, epixylous, sessile, dimidiate, imbricate; surface encrusted, glabrous: context thick, woody, brown; tubes thin-walled, minute, regular: spores smooth, hyaline."

Species
Flaviporus americanus (Ryvarden & Gilb.) Ginns (1984)
Flaviporus brownii (Humb.) Donk (1960)
Flaviporus citrinellus (Niemelä & Ryvarden) Ginns (1984)
Flaviporus delicatus A.David & Rajchenb. (1992) – Africa
Flaviporus hunua (G.Cunn.) Ginns (1984)
Flaviporus hydrophilus (Berk. & M.A.Curtis) Ginns (1980)
Flaviporus liebmannii (Fr.) Ginns (1980)
Flaviporus minutisporus (D.A.Reid, K.S.Thind & Chatr.) Ginns (1980) – Uttar Pradesh
Flaviporus stramineus (Bres.) Ginns (1984)
Flaviporus subhydrophilus (Speg.) Rajchenb. & J.E.Wright (1987)
Flaviporus venustus A.David & Rajchenb. (1985) – Martinique
Flaviporus xanthus A.David & Rajchenb. (1992) – Africa

References

Steccherinaceae
Polyporales genera
Taxa named by William Alphonso Murrill
Taxa described in 1905